Kim Jung-hyun (김정현; born January 3, 1990) is a South Korean football player.

Club statistics

References

External links

1990 births
Living people
Association football midfielders
South Korean footballers
South Korean expatriate footballers
J2 League players
FC Gifu players
Expatriate footballers in Japan
South Korean expatriate sportspeople in Japan